Antonio Ruberti (24 January 1927 – 4 September 2000) was an Italian politician and engineer. He was a member of the Italian Government and a European Commissioner as well as a professor of engineering at La Sapienza University.

Biography
Antonio Ruberti was born in Aversa in the province of Caserta, Campania.

He trained as an engineer and taught control engineering and systems theory as the first head of the Department of Science and Engineering of La Sapienza university in Rome, a university of which he was later Rector.

In 1987, he joined the Italian government as Minister for the Coordination of Scientific and Technological Research. He held this position for five years. In 1992 Ruberti was elected to the Chamber of Deputies among the ranks of the Italian Socialist Party, where he sat until 1993, when he was appointed by the Italian government to the European Commission chaired by Delors with the portfolio covering science, research, technological development and education. Ruberti was only a commissioner until 1995 but during this short mandate, he launched a series of new initiatives including the Socrates and Leonardo da Vinci programmes, the European Week of Scientific Culture, and the European Science and Technology Forum. After leaving the commission, Ruberti was once more elected to the Chamber of Deputies, where he chaired the Committee for European Union Policies.

He died in Rome in 2000.

References
EU obituary

20th-century Italian engineers
20th-century Italian politicians
1927 births
2000 deaths
People from Aversa
Engineers from Rome
Italian European Commissioners
Control theorists
Academic staff of the Sapienza University of Rome
Italian Socialist Party politicians
Democrats of the Left politicians